The composer Wolfgang Amadeus Mozart went by many different names in his lifetime. This resulted partly from the church traditions of the day, and partly from Mozart being multilingual and freely adapting his name to other languages.

Baptismal record
Mozart was baptized as Joannes Chrysostomus Wolfgangus Theophilus Mozart on 28 January 1756, the day after his birth, at St. Rupert's Cathedral in Salzburg. The baptismal register of the cathedral parish contains the entry shown below, written down in Latin by city chaplain Leopold Lamprecht. A transcription with editorial additions by Otto Erich Deutsch follows.

Mozart's father Leopold announced the birth of his son in a letter to the publisher Johann Jakob Lotter with the words "... the boy is called Joannes Chrisostomus, Wolfgang, Gottlieb" ("der Bub heißt Joannes Chrisostomus, Wolfgang, Gottlieb" in German). The baptismal names "Joannes" and "Chrysostomus" also have German equivalents, namely "Johann" and "Chrysostomos" (or less frequently, "Chrysostom"). The widely used Grove Dictionary of Music and Musicians employs these versions in the heading name for its Mozart article, which parenthesizes the little-used baptismal names: "(Johann Chrysostom) Wolfgang Amadeus Mozart."

Here are the details of the various names given on the register:
Mozart's first two baptismal names, "Joannes Chrysostomus", represent his saint's name, following the custom of the Catholic Church. They result from his birthday, 27 January, being the feast day of St. John Chrysostom. The document also records that Mozart was of legitimate birth and gives the names of his parents and his father Leopold's occupation as court musician. The first paragraph indicates that the baptism took place at 10:30 in the morning, and that Mozart had been born at 8:00 the night before. The baptismal name "Joannes Chrysostomus" was in conformance to Catholic custom and was not used by Mozart in everyday life. "Chrysostomus" means "golden mouth."
"Wolfgangus" is "Wolfgang", adapted to the Latin used in the parish register. Mozart used "Wolfgang" in German-speaking contexts. "Wolfgang", which means "walks with wolves", was the name of his maternal grandfather.
"Theophilus" comes from Greek and is variously rendered as "lover of God" or "loved by God." "Gottlieb" is its German form, and the familiar "Amadeus" is its Latin form. In later life, Mozart himself would use the Italian and French equivalents, respectively "Amadeo" and "Amadè". "Theophilus" was a name of Mozart's godfather, the merchant Joannes Theophilus Pergmayr, whose presence is recorded in the fourth paragraph.

Later life
Austrian musicologist Otto Erich Deutsch, who studied all available letters and documents about Mozart, arrived at the following conclusion about what he had called himself: "In Italy, from 1770, Mozart called himself 'Wolfgango Amadeo', and from about 1777, 'Wolfgang Amadé'."

The use of multiple language versions of the same name was perhaps common in Mozart's day. Joseph Haydn went by "Joseph" (German, English and French), "Josephus" (Latin) and "Giuseppe" (Italian); and Ludwig van Beethoven published his works as "Luigi" (Italian) and as "Louis" (French). (This use has persisted in Italy, where it is quite natural to this day to name a street "viale Giorgio Washington" after the American president, and the like.)

Mozart's preference for "Wolfgang Amadè" can be seen on the wedding contract for his marriage to Constanze Weber, dated August 3, 1782, where his signature says "Wolfgang Amadè Mozart". In the parish register entry for the marriage, dated August 4, Mozart is referred to as "Herr Wolfgang Adam Mozart", which is a different name but probably a misspelling for "Amadé" (or Amadeus).

Mozart spelled "Amadè" variously in regard to the accent on the final letter. Robert Spaethling, who translated many of Mozart's letters, writes, he "is especially nonchalant in his placement of Italian and French accents: sometime he writes 'chèr papa', at other times 'chér papa,' and even his own name appears variously as 'Amadé', 'Amadè', and plain 'Amade'." As a web search indicates, modern usage also varies among these three alternatives.

Mozart's preference for "Amadè" was not in general respected by others. Frequently, he was called either "Wolfgang Amadeus" or "Wolfgang Gottlieb". Here are examples:
The day Mozart died, his name was entered in the death records of the Vienna Magistrate as "Wolfgang Amadeus". This is the earliest posthumous source that uses the Latin version of his name. In this time it was common practice to use a latinized form for all death records.
In a letter dated December 11, 1791, Mozart's widow Constanze, in severe financial straits, asked to be given a pension by the Emperor (the appeal was ultimately successful). She signed herself "Konstantia Mozart, née Weber, widow relict of the late Wolfgang Amadeus Mozart." Imperial officials, replying to her request, used the same name.
A benefit concert for Mozart's family was held in Prague on December 28, 1791, billed as "Concert in memory of Wolfgang Gottlieb Mozart".

The rise of "Amadeus"
It is possible that the now-standard "Amadeus" originated as a facetious name. He signed some letters in mock Latin as "Wolfgangus Amadeus Mozartus"; this was certainly no accident as in one letter he did the same to the date of the letter as well: adding "-us" to the end of each word. But he never signed any letter as "Wolfgang Amadeus Mozart" himself.

Mozart's only mention as "Wolfgang Amadeus" in an official document made during his lifetime was found in 1998 by Mozart scholar Michael Lorenz in the registers of the Lower Austrian Governorship, where in May 1787 "Mozart Wolfgang Amadeus" is referred to as having applied for the return of his written surety for his friend . Other uses of "Amadeus", from immediately after Mozart's death in 1791, are given above.

The 19th century saw the gradual victory of "Amadeus" over alternative middle names. The earliest (18th century) biographers of Mozart, such as Friedrich Schlichtegroll and Franz Niemetschek, used "Gottlieb". However, in 1798 the publishing firm of Breitkopf & Härtel began to issue a (partial) Complete Works edition under the name "Amadeus". The dominance of "Amadeus" began around about 1810; Romanticism, notably in the person of E. T. A. Hoffmann, "seized upon this name to proclaim its veneration for Mozart". Although various scholars since that time have made use of "Amadè" or "Gottlieb", "Amadeus" remains by far the most familiar term for the general public.
 
The signature on the autograph scores is commonly "(di)Wolfgango Amadeo Mozart", although sometimes "Amadeo Wolfgango Mozart" is seen, for example on symphony 1 and the Haffner Symphony.  The autograph of his 35th (Haffner) symphony is held at the Morgan Library on Madison Ave. at 36th street, New York City. The violin concertos also show this variation, with the autographs of numbers 1 (K. 207) and 3 (K. 216) autographs in Krakow showing "Amadeo Wolfgango" and the remaining, including violin concerto no. 5 (K. 219) held at the U.S. Library of Congress, showing the more common Wolfgango Amadeo.

Facetious names
In the frequently playful letters of his youth Mozart would sometimes spell his name backwards, viz., "Mozart Wolfgang" or "Trazom". See above for the possible origin of "Amadeus" as facetious.

Notes

Sources

Further reading
Anderson, Emily (1938) The Letters of Mozart and His Family. Currently in print with Palgrave Macmillan (1989)

Deutsch, Otto Erich (1965) Mozart: A Documentary Biography. English translation by Eric Blom, Peter Branscombe, and Jeremy Noble. Stanford, California: Stanford University Press. This work contains English translations of all of the documents cited above.
The New Grove Dictionary of Music and Musicians, online edition, article "Mozart". Copyright 2008, Oxford University Press.
Solomon, Maynard (1996) Mozart: A Life. Harper Perennial. 

Name
Mozart
Language comparison